The Petropavlovsk class, sometimes referred to as the Poltava class, was a group of three pre-dreadnought battleships built for the Imperial Russian Navy during the 1890s. They were transferred to the Pacific Squadron shortly after their completion in 1899–1900 and were based at Port Arthur before the start of the Russo-Japanese War of 1904–1905. All three ships participated in the Battle of Port Arthur on the second day of the war.  sank two months after the war began after striking one or more mines laid by the Japanese.

Poltava was salvaged after the Japanese captured Port Arthur and incorporated into the Imperial Japanese Navy. The ship, renamed Tango in Japanese service, participated in the Battle of Tsingtao in late 1914, during World War I. She was sold back to the Russians in 1916 and renamed Chesma as her original name was in use by another battleship. The ship became the flagship of the Russian Arctic Flotilla in 1917, and her crew supported the Bolsheviks later that year. Chesma was seized by the British in early 1918 when they intervened in the Russian Civil War, abandoned by them when they withdrew and scrapped by the Soviets in 1924.

Background and description 

Tsar Alexander III's ambitious building programme of 1882 called for construction of 16 battleships in 20 years for the Baltic Fleet. By 1890 the program was behind schedule and the director of the Naval Ministry, Vice Admiral , proposed that six first-class and four second-class battleships be built together with some armored coast-defense ships to make up the numbers required.

The design began as an enlarged and improved version of the battleship , but with her main armament of four  guns mounted in lighter barbettes rather than the heavy gun turrets of the older ship. Use of the lighter barbette mounting allowed for a flush-deck hull, which gave the design high freeboard.

The design was intended to have a maximum speed of 17 knots using forced draft, but model testing of the hull showed that it could only reach . Rather than delay construction by redesigning the hull, the navy accepted the slower speed. Development of the quick-firing (QF) gun meant that an upper belt of armor was necessary and the weight required was gained by shortening the waterline armor belt, which left the ships' ends protected only by the sloping armor deck. Other changes included the replacement of the barbettes with turrets of the same type as used in the battleship  and the substitution of QF  guns for the original  guns. This last change saved enough weight to permit four more six-inch guns to be added.

Designed to displace , they were  overweight and actually displaced . The ships were the first flush-decked battleships built for the navy. They had a partial double bottom, and the hull was divided by 10 watertight transverse bulkheads; a centerline bulkhead divided the machinery spaces. The upper part of the hull between the main and upper decks curved inwards (tumblehome). Their crew consisted of 26–27 officers and 605–625 enlisted men; Petropavlovsk had a crew of 750 when serving as a flagship.

Unlike her sisters, Sevastopol had 16 boilers. The Naval Ministry chose not to exercise the penalty provisions of the contract for failing to attain the design speed because it had specified the machinery to be used.

Armament 
The main armament of the Petropavlovsk class consisted of four 40-caliber 12-inch guns mounted in twin-gun turrets fore and aft of the superstructure. They used hydraulic power for loading and traversing, but the ammunition hoists were electrically powered. Designed to fire one shell every 90 seconds, the rate of fire of the guns in service proved to be one round every three minutes. The structure of the turrets proved to be too weak to withstand extra-strength charges and had to be reinforced. The guns could elevate to a maximum of +15° and traverse 270°; each was provided with 58 rounds.

The secondary armament of the ships consisted of a dozen 45-caliber QF Canet Model 1892 six-inch guns. Eight of these were mounted in four twin-gun turrets on the upper deck and the remaining four guns were on pedestal mounts in unarmored embrasures in the sides of the hull, one deck below and between the turrets. Electric motors traversed the turrets and worked the ammunition hoists, but the guns were elevated manually. They had a 135° arc of fire, and the guns could elevate to a maximum of +15° and depress to −5°. The rate of fire of the turret-mounted guns was generally only about half that (two to three rounds per minute) of the pedestal-mounted guns. The motors and mechanism of the ammunition hoists were troublesome and sometimes reduced the rate of fire down to one round per minute. The guns in the hull could traverse 100° and each six-inch gun was provided with 200 rounds.

Smaller guns were carried for defense against torpedo boats. These included a dozen quick-firing (QF)  Hotchkiss guns in hull embrasures and on the superstructure. Twenty-eight smaller Maxim QF  guns were positioned in hull embrasures, on the superstructure and in the fighting tops.

The Petropavlovsk-class ships carried four  torpedo tubes, all above water, mounted on the broadside and two broadside  underwater tubes. The forward 15-inch tubes were near the forward main gun turret and were unprotected by any armor; aft, the 15-inch tubes were protected by the upper armor belt. The underwater tubes were protected underneath the armor deck, forward of the forward 12-inch magazine. Each ship also carried 50 mines to be laid to protect its anchorage in remote areas.

The ships were fitted with Liuzhol stadiametric rangefinders that used the angle between two vertical points on an enemy ship, usually the waterline and the crow's nest, to estimate the range. The gunnery officer consulted his references to get the range and calculated the proper elevation and deflection required to hit the target. He transmitted his commands via a Geisler electro-mechanical fire-control transmission system to each gun or turret.

Protection 
The Russian armor-plate industry had not yet mastered the process for forming thick steel plates so the armor for these ships was ordered from companies in Germany and the United States. Even they could not produce enough of the latest types of armor plate in the quantities required for all three ships. Petropavlovsk had ordinary nickel steel, while Sevastopol used Harvey armor and Poltava was fitted with the latest Krupp armor. The thicknesses of the armor plates varied in an attempt to equalize their effectiveness. Above the waterline belt was an upper strake of  armor that ran between the turret bases, seven and a half feet high. The ends of the upper belt were closed off by five-inch angled transverse bulkheads that connected the ends of the upper belt to the turret support tubes.

The turrets of the secondary armament had 5-inch sides with  roofs. The six-inch guns in the hull embrasures were unprotected. The sides of the conning tower were 9 inches thick while the armor deck in the central citadel was 2 inches thick.

Ships

Service 

Petropavlovsk was the first of the sisters to enter service; she departed Kronstadt on 17 October 1899 and reached Port Arthur on 10 May 1900. Upon her arrival, she became flagship of the Pacific Squadron commander, Vice Admiral Nikolai Skrydlov. The ship supported international efforts to suppress the Boxer Rebellion in mid-1900. Poltava and Sevastopol departed for Port Arthur on 15 October 1900 and arrived on 12 and 13 April 1901 respectively. Petropavlovsk was the flagship of Vice Admiral Oskar Stark at the beginning of the Russo-Japanese War in February 1904.

During the Battle of Port Arthur on the second day of the war, Poltava was hit twice in the aft hull, Petropavlovsk was hit three times in the bow and Sevastopol was hit once. Between them, the sisters had two men killed and seven wounded and were not significantly damaged. None of them made any hits on Japanese ships. The Naval Ministry relieved Stark, and he was replaced by Vice Admiral Stepan Makarov who assumed command on 7 March. On 31 March, Petropavlovsk and Poltava sortied to support Russian cruisers and destroyers engaging their Japanese counterparts, but they headed back to Port Arthur to join the rest of the Pacific Squadron when the main Japanese battlefleet appeared. They ran into a newly laid minefield en route and Petropavlovsk struck at least one of the mines, sinking in less than two minutes. Casualties included Admiral Makarov and his guest, the war artist Vasily Vereshchagin, 26 other officers and 652 enlisted men. Only 7 officers and 73 crewmen were rescued.

The new commander, Vice Admiral Wilgelm Vitgeft, made an attempt to lead the Pacific Squadron to Vladivostok on 23 June, but abandoned the sortie when the squadron was discovered and pursued by the Japanese. While returning to Port Arthur, Sevastopol struck a mine, and the ship took on an estimated  of water; despite the flooding she was able to keep up with the fleet and reached port successfully. While under repair, which lasted until 9 July, a fire broke out aboard the ship, killing 2 crewmen and injuring another 28. All of the 47- and 37-millimeter guns in the lower hull embrasures were removed from Poltava and Sevastopol during this time; some were remounted on the superstructure, but others were used to reinforce the land defenses of Port Arthur.

Vitgeft made another attempt to break through the Japanese blockade on 10 August in obedience to a direct order from Tsar Nicholas II. The squadron was spotted relatively quickly, and the Japanese main fleet intercepted the Russians in the early afternoon. In the resulting Battle of the Yellow Sea, Poltava and Sevastopol were the last battleships in the Russian column and the former, slowed by engine problems, became the primary target of the Japanese battleships and armored cruisers when Vitgeft maneuvered the squadron past the Japanese and forced them into a stern chase. Shortly before sunset, a lucky hit killed Vitgeft and threw the squadron into confusion. The Russian second-in-command, Rear Admiral Prince Pavel Ukhtomsky, eventually gained control of the squadron and led most of the ships back to Port Arthur. Poltava was hit by 12–14 large-caliber shells and lost 12 crewmen killed and 43 wounded; Sevastopol was hit by several shells that killed 1 and wounded 62 crewmen.

On 23 August, Sevastopol sortied to bombard Japanese troops and struck a mine near her forward magazines while returning to port. She was badly damaged and three of her magazines were flooded. The ship was towed back into Port Arthur and her repairs lasted until 6 November. In the meantime, the new squadron commander, Rear Admiral Robert Viren, decided to use the men and guns of the Pacific Squadron to reinforce the defenses of Port Arthur, and even more guns were stripped from the squadron's ships. By September Poltava had dismounted three 6-inch, four 47- and twenty-six 37-millimeter guns, and Sevastopol lost one 47- and twenty-six 37-millimeter guns. Both ships were lightly damaged by  shells in October when the Imperial Japanese Army's siege guns began firing blindly into the harbor. The capture of Hill 203, which overlooked the harbor, on 5 December allowed them to fire directly at the Russian ships, and Poltava was sunk in shallow water that same day by a shell that started a fire in a magazine that eventually exploded. By 7 December all of the Russian battleships except Sevastopol had been sunk and the ship's captain, Nikolai von Essen, anchored her under the guns of the remaining coast defense guns outside the harbor. He rigged torpedo nets and laid a minefield around his ship that thwarted repeated attacks until 16 December when one torpedo struck the ship in the stern during a blinding snowstorm. Badly damaged, Sevastopol was towed to deep water about two weeks later, when Port Arthur surrendered on 2 January 1905 and scuttled.

Poltava was subsequently raised, repaired and reclassified as a first-class coastal defense ship in the Imperial Japanese Navy. Renamed Tango (丹後), she served as a gunnery training ship and participated in the siege of Tsingtao at the beginning of World War I. She was sold back to Russia in March 1916 as the countries were now allies against the Central Powers and arrived in Vladivostok on 2 April 1916. She arrived at Alexandrovsk on 16 January 1917 after a brief refit in Birkenhead and became flagship of the Arctic Flotilla. Her crew joined the Bolsheviks in October 1917 and Chesma was captured by the British in Murmansk in March 1918 during the Allied intervention in the Russian Civil War. The ship was already in poor condition, and the British immobilized her when they departed Russia in October 1919. She was stricken from the Navy List on 3 July 1924 and subsequently scrapped.

Notes

Footnotes

Sources

External links 

 
 Petropavlovsk-class battleships

Battleship classes
 
Petropavlovsk class battleship (1897)